Sadia Dehlvi (1957 – 5 August 2020) was a Delhi-based activist, writer and a columnist with the daily newspaper, the Hindustan Times, and frequently published in Frontline and Urdu, Hindi and English newspapers and magazines. She was a devotee of Khwaja Gharib Nawaz of Ajmer and Nizamuddin Auliya of Delhi. She criticized radical interpretations of Islam and called for a pluralistic understanding of Islam. She produced and scripted documentaries and television programs, including Amma and Family (1995), starring Zohra Sehgal, a veteran stage actor.

Biography
Sadia Dehlvi was born in Delhi in 1957 into the Punjabi Saudagaran community.  Her grandfather, Yusuf Dehlvi, and her father, Yunus Dehlvi, lived in Shama Kothi on Sardar Patel Road, in New Delhi where she was born. The one-time cultural hub of Delhi, today it houses Bahujan Samaj Party headquarters, (since 2002).
 
In April 2009 Dehlvi published a book on Sufism entitled Sufism: The heart of Islam published by HarperCollins Publishers, India. Her second book, The Sufi Courtyard: Dargahs of Delhi,  detailing Delhi's Sufi history was also published by HarperCollins, India and released in February 2012.

She edited Bano an Urdu women's journal for the Shama Group, which published Shama an Urdu literary and film monthly. It eventually closed in 1999.

Dehlvi died on 5 August 2020.

Personal life
She married a Pakistani, Reza Pervaiz, in 1990. She then stayed in Karachi, where the couple had a son, Armaan in 1992. This marriage lasted for 12 years but ended in a divorce when Pervaiz emailed her "Talaq" three times on 8 April 2012. She later married 45-year-old Sayyed Karamat Ali, whom she met at Hazrat Shah Farhad, a Sufi shrine in Delhi, which she had been visiting for the last 20 years, and proudly referred to herself as  Sadia Sayyed Karamat Ali.

Sufism
Dehlvi wrote Sufism: The Heart of Islam in which she details Islam's Sufi traditions and the importance of what she sees as the Sufi message of love, tolerance and brotherhood.

Author
 Sufism, The Heart of Islam, Harpercollins, 2009. .
 "Dilli ka Dastarkhwan" – chapter in City Improbable : An Anthology of Writings on Delhi/edited by Khushwant Singh. New Delhi, Viking, 2001, xv, 286 p. .

Works
As Actress: 
 Zindagi Kitni Khoobsoorat Hai (2001) TV series
 Amma and Family (1995) TV series

Producer:
 Not a Nice Man to Know (1998) TV series (associate producer)

Writer:
 Amma and Family (1995) TV series

Further reading
 Sadia Dehlvi columns Outlook
Ideology of Intolerance – article Hindustan Times
 Sadia Dehlvi on Women Sufis of Delhi

References

External links
 
Sadia Dehlvi's blog
India Muslims Profile
Interview with Sadia Dehlvi
Srinagar Diary by Sadia Dehlvi in Outlook
Profile published in the Friday Times

– Book review Mukhtaran Mai

1957 births
2020 deaths
20th-century Indian journalists
20th-century Indian women writers
Activists from Delhi
Indian columnists
Indian magazine editors
21st-century Indian Muslims
Indian political writers
Indian television actresses
Indian television journalists
Indian television producers
Indian women activists
Indian women columnists
Indian women political writers
Indian women television journalists
Indian women television producers
Journalists from Delhi
Women writers from Delhi
Indian newspaper journalists
21st-century Indian women writers
21st-century Indian writers
21st-century Indian journalists
Women television producers
Women magazine editors